Up to now, various methods have been developed for the synthesis of bioglass, its composites, and other bioactive glasses, including conventional melt quench, sol–gel, flame synthesis and microwave irradiation. Bioglass synthesis has been reviewed by various groups. In this section we will majorly focus on sol-gel synthesis of bioglass composites, which is the highly efficient technique for bioglass composites for tissue engineering applications.

Melt quench synthesis 
The first bioactive glass was developed by Hench in 1969 through melting mixture of the related oxide precursors at relatively high temperatures. The original bioactive glass was melt-derived (46.1 mol%, SiO2, 24.4 mol%, Na2O, 26.9 mol% CaO, and 2.6 mol% P2O5) and was named Bioglass. The choice of the glass composition for a specific application should be based on a firm knowledge on the influence of all major components on the most relevant properties of the glass with regard to both the final use and the manufacture of the product. Despite extensive research during the past 40 years, only a few glass compositions have been accepted for clinical use. The two US Food and Drug Administration FDA approved melt-derived compositions 45S5 and S53P4 consist of four oxides: SiO2, Na2O, CaO and P2O5. In general, a great number of elements can be dissolved in glasses. The effect of Al2O3, B2O3, Fe2O3, MgO, SrO, BaO, ZnO, Li2O, K2O, CaF2 and TiO2 on the in vitro or in vivo properties of certain compositions of bioactive glasses has been reported. However, the influence of the composition on the properties and compatibility of bioactive and biodegradable glasses is not fully understood.

The scaffolds fabricated by melt quench technique have much less porosity which causes healing and defects in tissue integration during in-vivo testing.

Sol–gel process 
The sol–gel process has a long history of use for synthesis of silicate systems and other oxides and it has become a widely spread research field with high technological relevance, for example for the fabrication of thin films, coatings, nanoparticles and fibers. Sol-gel processing technology at low temperatures, an alternative to traditional melt processing of glasses, involves the synthesis of a solution (sol), typically composed of metal-organic and metal salt precursors followed by the formation of a gel by chemical reaction or aggregation, and lastly thermal treatment for drying, organic removal, and sometimes crystallization and cooling treatment. The synthesis of specific silicate bioactive glasses by the sol–gel technique at low temperatures using metal alkoxides as precursors was shown in 1991 by Li et al. For the synthesis of bioactive glasses, typical precursors used are tetraethyl orthosilicate, calcium nitrate and triethylphosphate. After hydrolysis and poly-condensation reactions a gel is formed which subsequently is calcinated at 600–700°C to form the glass. Based on the preparation method, sol–gel derived products, e.g. thin films or particles are highly porous exhibiting a high specific surface area. Recent work on fabricating bioactive silicate glass nanoparticles by sol–gel process has been carried out by Hong et al. In their research, nanoscale bioactive glass particles were obtained by the combination of two steps; sol–gel route and co-precipitation method, wherein the mixture of precursors was hydrolyzed in acidic environment and condensed in alkaline condition separately, and then followed by a freeze-drying process. The morphology and size of bioactive glass nanoparticles could be tailored by varying the production conditions and the feeding ratio of reagents.

Different ions can be added to bioactive glasses, such as zinc, magnesium, zirconium, titanium, boron, and silver in order to improve the glass functionality and bioactivity. However, it is usually difficult to synthesize bioactive glasses in nano-size scale with addition of those ions. More recently, Delben et al. have developed sol–gel-derived bioactive glass doped with silver and reported that the Si–O–Si bond number increased with increasing silver concentration and this resulted in structural densification. It was also observed that quartz and metallic silver crystallization increased with the increase in silver content in bioactive glass while hydroxyapatite crystallization decreased.

There is wide agreement about the versatility of the sol–gel technique to synthesize inorganic materials and it has been shown to be suitable for production of a variety of bioactive glasses. However, the method is also limited in terms of compositions that can be produced. Moreover, remaining water or residual solvent content may result in complications of the method for the intended biomedical applications of the nanoparticles or nanofibres produced. Usually a high temperature calcination step is required to eliminate organics remnants. In addition, sol–gel processing is relatively time consuming and since it is not a continuous process, batch-to-batch variations may occur.

Newer methods 
Newer methods include flame and microwave synthesis of Bioglass, which has been gaining attention in recent years. Flame synthesis works by baking the powders directly in a flame reactor. Microwave synthesis is a rapid and low-cost powder synthesis method in which precursors are dissolved in water, transferred to an ultrasonic bath, and irradiated.

References

Biomaterials